The Bravo class is a series of 10 container ships built for Seaspan Corporation. They were initially chartered to Mitsui O.S.K. Lines (MOL) and later to Ocean Network Express (ONE). The ships were built by Jiangsu Yangzi Xinfu Shipbuilding in China. The ships have a maximum theoretical capacity of around 10,100 twenty-foot equivalent units (TEU).

List of ships

See also 
MOL Triumph-class container ship
MOL Creation-class container ship
MOL Maestro-class container ship
MOL Globe-class container ship

References 

Container ship classes
Ships built in China